Bertl Schultes (1881–1964) was a German comedy stage and film actor. He travelled with the director Franz Osten to India for the making of The Light of Asia in 1925, acting as an interpreter and assistant director.

Selected filmography
 The Prodigal Son (1934)
 The Sinful Village (1940)
 The Fire Devil (1940)
 The Violin Maker of Mittenwald (1950)
 The Cloister of Martins (1951)
 Heimat Bells (1952)
 The Immortal Vagabond (1953)
 The Mill in the Black Forest (1953)
 The Hunter's Cross (1954)
 Two Bavarians in the Jungle (1957)

References

Bibliography 
 Rogowski, Christian. The Many Faces of Weimar Cinema: Rediscovering Germany's Filmic Legacy. Camden House, 2010.

External links 
 

1881 births
1964 deaths
Male actors from Munich
German male film actors
German male stage actors